Spell is the only album by former Wham! and George Michael bassist, Deon Estus.

The album contained the hit single "Heaven Help Me", which featured background vocals by Michael, and reached number 5 on the U.S. Billboard Hot 100 chart in 1989.

Track listing 
 "Me or the Rumours" (The Jellybean Mix) (Deon Estus, Kenny Young) – 4:05  
 "Spell" (Estus) – 4:38 
 "Love Me Over" (Estus) – 4:08
 "You're the Only One for Me" (Kevin Calhoun, Matt Noble) – 4:11
 "False Start" (Estus) – 4:05
 "Heaven Help Me" (Estus, George Michael) – 4:40
 "Blue Envelope" (Estus, Young) – 3:38
 "Love Can't Wait" (Estus) – 3:56
 "Solid Ground" (Estus, Simon Climie) – 4:16
 "Me or the Rumours" (The George Michael Mix)" (Estus, Young) – 3:42

Personnel
 Deon Estus – lead and backing vocals, keyboards (2, 5, 8), bass (5, 6, 8, 9), arrangements (9)
 Richard Cottle – keyboards (1, 7, 10)
 George McFarlane – keyboards (1, 5, 7, 8, 10), drum samples (5, 8)
 Nick Glennie-Smith – keyboards (2, 5, 8), strings (2)
 Lyndon Connah – keyboards (3)
 Matt Noble – keyboards (4), guitar (4), arrangements (4)
 Danny Schogger – keyboards (6)
 Ricky Peterson – keyboards (9), drums (9)
 Jim Williams – guitar (1, 10)
 Hugh Burns – guitar (2, 6)
 Kevin Calhoun – guitar (4), arrangements (4)
 Phil Palmer – guitar (7)
 Levi Seacer, Jr. – guitar (9)
 Andy Duncan – drum samples (1, 5-8, 10), percussion (1, 7, 10), drum programming (2), drums (3)
 Jimmy Copley – hi-hats (1, 7, 10)
 Trevor Murrell – drum and hi-hat overdubs (2)
 David Z – drums (4, 9), arrangements (4, 9)
 Steve Sidwell – trumpet (2, 6)
 Paul Spong – trumpet (2, 6)
 Rick Taylor – trombone (2)
 Simon Climie – arrangements (9)
 Colin Campsie – backing vocals (1, 7)
 George Michael – backing vocals (6)
 Ginger Commodore – backing vocals (9)
 Javetta Steele – backing vocals (9)
 J.D. Steele – backing vocals (9)
 Jearlyn Steele – backing vocals (9)

References

1989 debut albums